The  is an archaeological site containing the ruins of a Jōmon period cave dwelling located in what is now the northern part of the town of Takahata, Yamagata in the Tōhoku region of Japan. The site was designated a National Historic Site of Japan in 1980.

Overview
The site consists of three caves which are located in on a tuff cliff near the headwaters of the Ichinosawa River, a tributary of the Yashiro River that flows into Yonezawa Basin, at an elevation of approximately 40 meters above the valley floor. The caves were discovered in 1958 and excavated in 1960. Cave 1 extends 40 meters into the hill, and was found to contain a stratified cultural layer two meters in thickness. The uppermost layer contained shards of Haji ware pottery and iron fragments from the Yayoi period, the second layer had pottery and stone tools from the early Jōmon period (4000–2500 BCE) . The third layer had the most abundant artifacts, with a large amount of Jōmon earthenware  and stone tools dating from the Incipient Jōmon (14,000–7500 BCE).

The site is one of several similar cave dwelling sites which have been found in the vicinity. It is located approximately 30 minutes by car from Takahata Station on the Yamagata Shinkansen.

See also
List of Historic Sites of Japan (Yamagata)
Hinata Caves
Ōdachi Caves

References

External links
Takahata city official site 
Yamagata Prefecture site 

Jōmon period
History of Yamagata Prefecture
Takahata, Yamagata
Archaeological sites in Japan
Historic Sites of Japan